The South Dakota State Historical Society is South Dakota's official state historical society and operates statewide but is headquartered in Pierre, South Dakota at 900 Governors Drive. It is a part of the South Dakota Department of Education.

History
The South Dakota State Historical Society, after an initial meeting in April, was founded on May 7, 1862 as the Old Settlers Association of Dakota Territory. It was renamed the Historical Society of Dakota in 1863 and the State Historical Society of South Dakota in 1890 months after the state was admitted to the union. In 1901, the South Dakota Legislature took the Society into state government when it established the Association as the official state historical society. With each change of name, the property of the old Society was formally transferred to its successor. 

Over the years the Society was quartered in various places from the territorial post office in Yankton, an old statehouse, Pierre University, and the current State Capitol. In 1932, the Society opened the new Soldier's and Sailor's Memorial Building. In 1989, the Culture Heritage Center was opened as a home for all archives, a museum, and their administrative offices. 

In 1975, the State Archives were incorporated into the Society, which continues to operate them and also functions as a public library. 

In 2014, the South Dakota State Historical Society published an annotated version of Wilder's autobiography, titled Pioneer Girl: The Annotated Autobiography, by Laura Ingalls Wilder, Pamela Smith Hill (Editor).

Programs
In addition to the State Archives, the Society operates the Museum of the South Dakota State Historical Society, the State Historic Preservation Office, the South Dakota State Historical Society Press, and an archaeological research center.

Directors
 Benjamin F. Jones, Ph.D. (2020-
 Jay D. Vogt (2003-2020)
 Mary B. Edelen (1995-2003)
 J. R. Fishburne (1987-1994)
 Fred Lillibridge (1985-1987)
 Dayton Canaday (1968-1984)
 Will G. Robinson (1948-1968)
 Lawrence A. Fox (1926-1946)
 Doane Robinson (1901-1925)

References

External links
South Dakota State Historical Society — official site

Libraries in South Dakota
History of South Dakota
Museums in Hughes County, South Dakota
Museums established in 1901
History museums in South Dakota
State historical societies of the United States
Buildings and structures in Pierre, South Dakota
1862 establishments in Dakota Territory